is a Japanese actor and narrator. He began his career narrating television commercials and instructional videos for corporations.  He debuted as a voice actor in Square-Enix's Final Fantasy VII Advent Children.

Filmography

Stage

References

Japanese male musical theatre actors
Japanese male video game actors
Japanese male voice actors
Living people
1963 births
Place of birth missing (living people)
21st-century Japanese male actors